Penguins are milk chocolate bars filled with biscuit and chocolate cream. They are produced by Pladis's manufacturing division McVitie's at their Stockport factory.

History
William Macdonald founded Macdonald Biscuits in Glasgow in 1928. After seeing some biscuits from Antwerp he was inspired to create a chocolate covered biscuit with a chocolate cream sandwich in the centre. They were first produced in 1932, and became a McVitie's product after MacDonald was taken over by United Biscuits in 1965. Each wrapper has a joke or "funny fact" printed on it and imaginative, often humorous designs featuring penguins that often pastiche famous works of art.

The Tim Tam, produced by Arnott's in Australia and first sold in 1964, was based on the Penguin. Occasional media references include tongue-in-cheek debates over which is the superior biscuit.

During the 1980s, the Penguin brand became known for their television advertising slogan "P...P...P...Pick up a penguin!” 

In October 1996, Penguins were the subject of a court case between Asda and United Biscuits, who accused Asda of passing off their own brand "Puffin" biscuits as part of the Penguin brand. In March 1997, the court found in favour of United Biscuits regarding passing off, but found that Asda had not infringed the Penguin trademark.

United Biscuits had been criticised for continuing to use trans fatty acids in the cream filling of Penguins. By December 2007, United Biscuits began to advertise the absence of trans fats from Penguins, having removed the ingredient from this product line.

Wrapper
The back of the wrapper typically has a joke.

Types 
There are four variations of the biscuit:
 Chocolate
 Orange
 Mint
 Toffee

Spin off brands
In June 2003, McVitie's produced several "sub brands" or variations of the Penguin biscuit: Penguin Chukkas, Wing Dings, Flipper Dipper, Splatz and Mini Splatz. These variations were accompanied by a £5 million promotional campaign. In January 2008, McVitie's also produced Penguin triple chocolate wafers.

Notes

Food brands of the United Kingdom
Chocolate bars
Scottish desserts
United Biscuits brands
Scottish brands